Tyvis Chansey Powell (born February 16, 1994) is an American football safety for the BC Lions of the Canadian Football League (CFL). He played college football at Ohio State.

Early years
Powell attended Bedford High School in Bedford, Ohio. He was rated by Rivals.com as a three-star recruit and was scouted by several large NCAA Division I universities including, but not limited to: Michigan State, Minnesota, West Virginia and Ohio State. Immediately following the resignation of then-Ohio State head coach Jim Tressel, Powell committed to Ohio State on June 1, 2011.

College career
Following his verbal commitment to Ohio State in June 2011, Powell accepted an athletic scholarship to play for coach Urban Meyer's Buckeyes in the fall of 2012.

2012 season
Powell was redshirted  in 2012 and did not play during the season. This would save his eligibility to begin play the following year.

2013 season
Powell began his collegiate career as a backup Safety to Corey Brown. Powell would appear in all 14 games with five starts as a redshirt freshman in 2013, including a starting appearance at Safety in the Orange Bowl. He would conclude the season with 48 tackles and one interception.

2014 season
As a sophomore in 2014, he started all 15 games, recording 76 tackles and four interceptions. He was named the Defensive MVP of the 2015 College Football Playoff National Championship victory over Oregon Ducks after he had a game-high nine tackles.

2015 season
As a junior in 2015, Powell started all 13 games and had 71 tackles and three interceptions. After the season, he entered the 2016 NFL Draft.

College statistics

Professional career
Powell was rated the 6th best Safety in the 2016 NFL Draft by NFLDraftScout.com.

Seattle Seahawks
Powell signed with the Seattle Seahawks as an undrafted free agent following the 2016 NFL Draft. He was released by the Seahawks on January 4, 2017.

Cleveland Browns
On February 6, 2017, Powell was claimed off waivers by the Cleveland Browns. He was waived by the Browns on June 9, 2017.

Indianapolis Colts
On June 12, 2017, Powell was claimed off waivers by the Indianapolis Colts. He was waived/injured on September 2, 2017 and was placed on injured reserve. He was released on September 12, 2017.

Seattle Seahawks (second stint)
On September 19, 2017, Powell was signed to the Seahawks' practice squad. He was released on September 26, 2017 but re-signed a few days later. He was released on October 24, 2017.

San Francisco 49ers
On November 1, 2017, Powell was signed to the San Francisco 49ers' practice squad. He was promoted to the active roster on December 16, 2017.

On September 1, 2018, Powell was waived by the 49ers and was signed to the practice squad the next day. He was promoted to the active roster on September 22, 2018. He was waived on October 6, 2018 and was re-signed to the practice squad. He was promoted to the active roster on October 20, 2018. On November 1, 2018, he started at Free Safety in the 49ers' Week 9 game against the Oakland Raiders. Powell recorded three tackles in San Francisco's 34-3 win. He was waived on November 12, 2018.

New York Jets
On December 4, 2018, Powell was signed to the New York Jets practice squad, but was released a week later.

San Francisco 49ers (second stint)
On December 18, 2018, Powell signed with the San Francisco 49ers.

Houston Texans
On July 27, 2019, Powell signed with the Houston Texans. He was waived on August 3, 2019.

Dallas Cowboys
On August 5, 2019, Powell was signed by the Dallas Cowboys. He was waived/injured during final roster cuts on August 31, and reverted to the team's injured reserve list the next day. He was waived from injured reserve with an injury settlement on September 6.

Denver Broncos
On November 12, 2019, Powell was signed to the Denver Broncos practice squad. He signed a reserve/future contract with the Broncos on December 31, 2019. He was waived on April 27, 2020.

BC Lions
Powell signed with the BC Lions of the CFL on June 16, 2021.

References

External links
Seattle Seahawks bio
Ohio State Buckeyes bio

1994 births
Living people
American football safeties
BC Lions players
Cleveland Browns players
Dallas Cowboys players
Denver Broncos players
Houston Texans players
Indianapolis Colts players
New York Jets players
Ohio State Buckeyes football players
People from Bedford, Ohio
Players of American football from Ohio
San Francisco 49ers players
Seattle Seahawks players
Sportspeople from Cuyahoga County, Ohio